"Goodbye" is a song recorded by South Korean girl group 2NE1. It was released via YG Entertainment on January 21, 2017, as the group's farewell following their disbandment in November 2016. It was written by CL with additional lyrics penned by Hyukoh's Oh Hyuk, whilst production was handled by J Gramm and Rook Monroe. It was the group's first release in three years following their hiatus. The song marks the first and last single released by 2NE1 as a trio, following Minzy's departure in April 2016.

Background

CL revealed in an interview that the song was originally meant to be a letter addressed to Minzy following her departure from 2NE1 in April 2016. She reportedly wrote the original lyrics of the song in ten minutes. Following the group's disbandment in November 2016, CL altered the track's lyrics to reflect the remaining members. After the song's release on January 21, however, Minzy revealed that she was unaware that the members were releasing a new recording, only finding out about the release through the news.

Atwood Magazine described the song as an "elementary down-tempo ballad that fuses constant guitar strumming in tandem with the poignant tear-jerking lyrics." The music video of “Goodbye” evokes the feelings from the members through a black and white screening of the girls gazing at archived videos of themselves as a quartet.

Commercial performance
Commercially, "Goodbye" charted moderately in South Korea, peaking at number 23 on the Gaon Digital Chart. It became the group's second single after "I Am the Best" to top the Billboard US World Digital Song Sales, garnering 5,000 paid downloads in the US within a week. It was their 16th top ten entry and 20th entry on the chart overall. In France, "Goodbye" entered the SNEP singles chart at number 109, marking their second entry in the country. It additionally peaked at number 14 on the Official Download Chart in Finland.

Credits and personnel 
Credits adapted from Melon.
 2NE1 – lead vocals
 CL – lyricist, vocals
 Sandara Park – vocals
 Park Bom – vocals
 Oh Hyuk – lyricist
 J Gramm – composition
 Rook Monroe – composition

Charts

References

2NE1 songs
Korean-language songs
YG Entertainment singles